"Old Stone Face" is a nickname for:

 Buster Keaton (1895–1966), American actor, vaudevillian, comedian, filmmaker, stunt performer and writer, also known as the "Great Stone Face"
 Ed Sullivan (1901–1974), American television host and writer
 John Lowe (born 1945), English retired darts player
 Andrei Gromyko (1909-1989), Soviet communist politician

See also
 Judge Dredd, futuristic policeman from the 2000 AD comic, called "Old Stony Face"
 Stoneface (disambiguation)
 Old Man of the Mountain

Lists of people by nickname